Walter Zellot (6 October 1920 – 10 September 1942) was a World War II fighter pilot from Nazi Germany. Zellot is credited with shooting down 86 Allied aircraft in 296 combat missions. Among these 83 were achieved over the Eastern Front.

Career
Zellot was born on 6 October 1920in Spittal an der Drau in Carinthia of the Republic of Austria. In 1941, Tonne was posted Jagdgeschwader 53 (JG 53—53rd Fighter Wing) where he was assigned to  1. Staffel (1st Squadron). On 6 June. I. Gruppe moved to Mannheim-Sandhofen Airfield.

Operation Barbarossa and Malta
On 22 June, the Geschwader crossed into Soviet airspace in support of Operation Barbarossa, the invasion of the Soviet Union, which opened the Eastern Front. I. Gruppe took off on its first mission at 3:40 am, escorting Junkers Ju 87 dive bombers. On the second mission of the day which took off at 9:10 am, again escorting Ju 87 dive bombers, Zellot claimed his first aerial victory when he shot down a Polikarpov I-16 fighter. Supporting the German attack, the Gruppe moved to Pruzhany on 25 June, to Baranavichy on 29 June, to Hostynne the next day, reaching Dubno on 5 July. Here, Zellot claimed his second aerial victory on 6 July.

In December 1941, I. Gruppe was moved to Mediterranean air bases at Gela in Sicily where they fought in the aerial battles of the Siege of Malta.

Eastern Front
In early May 1942, I. Gruppe was transferred back to the Eastern Front. Prior to the relocation, the Gruppe received a full complement of 41 factory new  Messerschmitt Bf 109 F-4 aircraft at Schwäbisch Hall before heading for Prague Ruzyne Airfield on 28 May. The following day, I. Gruppe flew to Kursk. There, the Gruppe supported the German 4th Panzer Army in its advance towards Voronezh during Case Blue, the 1942 strategic summer offensive in southern Russia between 28 June and 24 November 1942.

Squadron leader and death
On 19 August 1942, Zellot was appointed Staffelkapitän (squadron leader) of 2. Staffel of JG 53, replacing Hauptmann Klaus Quaet-Faslem who was transferred. On 23 August, German forces launched the Battle of Stalingrad with the 16th Panzer Division, and elements of the 3rd Motorized Infantry Division and 60th Motorized Infantry Division crossing the Don near Vertyachy. That day, Zellot claimed four aerial victories in support of the German attack.

However, earlier on the same day of his appointment on 19 August 1942, his Bf 109 G-2 (Werknummer 14189—factory number) was shot-up by a Soviet fighter, probably the Yakovlev Yak-1 flown by future ace Boris M. Vasilyev (929 IAP). Zellot was awarded the Knight's Cross of the Iron Cross on 3 September 1942 following his 75th aerial victory.

On 10 September 1942, Zellot was killed in action while engaged in a low-level attack on Soviet troops northwest of Stalingrad, shot down by anti-aircraft fire. He bailed out at low altitude, insufficient for his parachute to open, and was killed. According to Prien, Zellot may have been shot down by friendly fire. At the time oh his death, he was the most successful fighter pilot of I. Gruppe of JG 53. Zellot was temporarily succeeded by Oberleutnant Friedrich-Karl Müller as commander of 2. Staffel. In parallel, Müller who was officially heading 1. Staffel of JG 53.

Summary of military career

Aerial victory claims
According to US historian David T. Zabecki, Zellot was credited with 85 aerial victories. Mathews and Foreman, authors of Luftwaffe Aces — Biographies and Victory Claims, researched the German Federal Archives and found records for 84 aerial victory claims, including 81 aerial victories on the Eastern Front and three on the Western Front.

Victory claims were logged to a map-reference (PQ = Planquadrat), for example "PQ 49721". These sectors were then subdivided into 36 smaller units to give a location area 3 × 4 km in size.

Awards
 Honour Goblet of the Luftwaffe on 31 August 1942 as Leutnant and pilot
 German Cross in Gold on 15 October 1942 as Leutnant in the I./Jagdgeschwader 53
 Knight's Cross of the Iron Cross on 3 September 1942 as Leutnant and pilot in the I./Jagdgeschwader 53

Notes

References

Citations

Bibliography

 
 
 
 
 Mijail Yurevich Bykov (2008). Асы Великой Отечественной Войны. Самые результативные лётчики 1941-1945 гг. (Asy Velikoy Otechestvennoy Voyny. Samye rezultativnye liotchiki 1941-45 gg), Yauza-EKSMO, Moscow.
 
 
 
 
 
 
 
 
 
 
 
 

1920 births
1942 deaths
Luftwaffe pilots
People from Spittal an der Drau
German World War II flying aces
Recipients of the Knight's Cross of the Iron Cross
Military personnel killed by friendly fire
Luftwaffe personnel killed in World War II
Aviators killed by being shot down
Friendly fire incidents of World War II